Navajo County is in the northern part of the U.S. state of Arizona. As of the 2020 census, its population was 106,717. The county seat is Holbrook.

Navajo County comprises the Show Low, Arizona Micropolitan Statistical Area.

Navajo County contains parts of the Hopi Indian reservation, the Navajo Nation, and Fort Apache Indian Reservation.

History
Navajo County was split from Apache County on March 21, 1895. The first county sheriff was Commodore Perry Owens, a legendary gunman who had previously served as the sheriff of Apache County. It was the location for many of the events of the Pleasant Valley War.

Geography

Navajo County offers not only the Monument Valley, but Keams Canyon, part of the Petrified Forest National Park, and one of the largest contiguous ponderosa pine forest in North America.

Adjacent counties
 Apache County – east
 Graham County – south
 Gila County – southwest
 Coconino County – west
 San Juan County, Utah – north

Indian reservations
Navajo County has  of federally designated Indian reservation within its borders, the third most of any county in the United States (neighboring Apache County and Coconino County are first and second). In descending order of territory within the county, the reservations are the Navajo Nation, Hopi Indian Reservation, and Fort Apache Indian Reservation, all of which are partly located within Navajo County.

National protected areas

 Apache-Sitgreaves National Forest (part)
 Navajo National Monument
 Petrified Forest National Park (part)

Demographics

2000 census
As of the census of 2000, there were 97,470 people, 30,043 households, and 23,073 families living in the county. The racial makeup of the county was 47.7% Native American, 45.9% White, 0.9% Black or African American, 0.3% Asian, 0.1% Pacific Islander, 3.2% from other races, and 55.9% from two or more races.  8.2% of the population were Hispanic or Latino of any race. 24.8% reported speaking Navajo at home, 5.9% other Southern Athabaskan languages, 4.7% Spanish, and 3.2% Hopi.

There were 30,043 households, out of which 40.5% had children under the age of 18 living with them, 55.5% were married couples living together, 16.3% had a female householder with no husband present, and 23.2% were non-families. 19.9% of all households were made up of individuals, and 7.2% had someone living alone who was 65 years of age or older.  The average household size was 3.17 and the average family size was 3.68.

In the county, the population was spread out, with 35.4% under the age of 18, 8.8% from 18 to 24, 25.3% from 25 to 44, 20.4% from 45 to 64, and 10.0% who were 65 years of age or older.  The median age was 30 years. For every 100 females there were 98.7 males.  For every 100 females age 18 and over, there were 97.2 males.

The median income for a household in the county was $28,569, and the median income for a family was $32,409. Males had a median income of $30,509 versus $21,621 for females. The per capita income for the county was $11,609.  About 23.4% of families and 29.5% of the population were below the poverty line, including 36.6% of those under age 18 and 20.3% of those age 65 or over.

2010 census
As of the census of 2010, there were 107,449 people, 35,658 households, and 25,923 families living in the county. The racial makeup of the county was 49.3% white, 43.4% American Indian, 0.9% black or African American, 0.5% Asian, 0.1% Pacific islander, 3.4% from other races, and 2.5% from two or more races. Those of Hispanic or Latino origin made up 10.8% of the population. In terms of ancestry, 13.7% were German, 12.5% were English, 9.3% were Irish, and 2.3% were American.

Of the 35,658 households, 39.2% had children under the age of 18 living with them, 49.1% were married couples living together, 17.1% had a female householder with no husband present, 27.3% were non-families, and 23.0% of all households were made up of individuals. The average household size was 2.95 and the average family size was 3.50. The median age was 34.7 years.

The median income for a household in the county was $39,774 and the median income for a family was $45,906. Males had a median income of $41,516 versus $28,969 for females. The per capita income for the county was $16,745. About 19.1% of families and 24.4% of the population were below the poverty line, including 32.6% of those under age 18 and 12.4% of those age 65 or over.

2020 census of religion
Navajo County is among the most religiously diverse places in the United States. A 2020 census by the Public Religion Research Institute (unconnected to the official US census) calculates a religious diversity score of 0.876 for Navajo County, where 1 represents complete diversity (each religious group of equal size) and 0 a total lack of diversity. Only three other counties in the US have higher scores, all much more urban than Navajo County.

Politics
Navajo County leans towards the Republican Party. Although its Native American population makes up nearly half of the county, a demographic that politically favors those of the Democratic Party, the county has a strong Latter-Day Saint presence (particularly in population centers such as Snowflake) that normally allows Republican candidates to carry the county by small margins. However, in the 2018 gubernatorial election, the county voted Republican over Democrat by a large margin (56–42%).

Education
School districts that serve the county include:

 Blue Ridge Unified School District
 Cedar Unified School District
 Heber-Overgaard Unified School District
 Holbrook Unified School District
 Joseph City Unified School District
 Kayenta Unified School District
 Piñon Unified School District
 Show Low Unified School District
 Snowflake Unified School District
 Whiteriver Unified School District
 Winslow Unified School District

There is a tribal elementary school called Little Singer Community School, affiliated with the Bureau of Indian Education (BIE). Hataalii Yazhi, a medicine man, in the 1970s proposed establishing the school so area children did not have to travel far for their education. The school was named after him. The original buildings used two geodesic domes as features. In 2014 the school had 81 students. By 2014 the original campus was described by the Associated Press as being in poor repair. In 2004 the school first asked the BIE to get funding for a new building. It uses intersecting circles as an architectural feature. The current building was dedicated in November 2020.

Transportation

Major highways

  Interstate 40
  U.S. Route 60
  U.S. Route 160
  U.S. Route 163
  U.S. Route 180
  State Route 73
  State Route 77
  State Route 87
  State Route 98
  State Route 99
  State Route 260
  State Route 264
  State Route 277
  State Route 377

Airports
The following public-use airports are located within the county:
 Cibecue Airport (Z95) – Cibecue
 Holbrook Municipal Airport (P14) – Holbrook
 Kayenta Airport (0V7) – Kayenta
 Polacca Airport (P10) – Polacca
 Show Low Regional Airport (SOW) – Show Low
 Taylor Airport (TYL) – Taylor
 Whiteriver Airport (E24) – Whiteriver
 Winslow–Lindbergh Regional Airport (INW) – Winslow

Communities and other places

Cities
 Holbrook (county seat)
 Show Low
 Winslow

Towns
 Kayenta
 Pinetop-Lakeside
 Snowflake
 Taylor

Census-designated places

 Chilchinbito
 Cibecue
 Clay Springs
 Dilkon
 East Fork
 First Mesa
 Fort Apache
 Greasewood
 Hard Rock
 Heber-Overgaard
 Hondah
 Hotevilla-Bacavi
 Indian Wells
 Jeddito
 Joseph City
 Keams Canyon
 Kykotsmovi Village
 Lake of the Woods
 Linden
 Low Mountain
 McNary (mostly in Apache County)
 North Fork
 Oljato-Monument Valley
 Pinedale
 Pinetop Country Club
 Pinon
 Rainbow City
 Seba Dalkai
 Second Mesa
 Seven Mile
 Shongopovi
 Shonto
 Shumway
 Sun Valley
 Tees Toh
 Turkey Creek
 Wagon Wheel
 White Mountain Lake
 Whitecone
 Whiteriver
 Winslow West (partially in Coconino County)
 Woodruff

Other communities
 Birdsprings
 Oraibi

Native American communities
 Fort Apache Indian Reservation
 Hopi Reservation
 Navajo Nation

Other places

Ghost towns
 Brigham
 Obed
 Sunset
 Wilford
 Zeniff

County population ranking
The population ranking of the following table is based on the 2010 census of Navajo County.

† county seat

See also
 National Register of Historic Places listings in Navajo County, Arizona

References

External links
 Official county homepage

 
Arizona placenames of Native American origin
Populated places established in 1895
1895 establishments in Arizona Territory